Szentendre is a district in north-western part of Pest County. Szentendre is also the name of the town where the district seat is found. The district is located in the Central Hungary Statistical Region.

Geography 
Szentendre District borders with Szob District to the north, Vác District and Dunakeszi District to the east, Budapest to the south, Pilisvörösvár District to the southwest, Esztergom District (Komárom-Esztergom County) to the west. The district includes the whole of Szentendre Island in the Danube. The number of the inhabited places in Szentendre District is 13.

Municipalities 
The district has 4 towns, 1 large village and 8 villages.
(ordered by population, as of 1 January 2013)

The bolded municipalities are cities, italics municipality is large village.

Demographics

In 2011, it had a population of 77,802 and the population density was 238/km².

Ethnicity
Besides the Hungarian majority, the main minorities are the German (approx. 2,500), Slovak (1,100), Roma (1,000), Serb (450), Romanian (300), Russian and Polish (150), Croat (100).

Total population (2011 census): 77,802
Ethnic groups (2011 census): Identified themselves: 75,440 persons:
Hungarians: 68,057 (90.21%)
Germans: 2,585 (3.43%)
Slovaks: 1,093 (1.45%)
Gypsies: 1,030 (1.36%)
Others and indefinable: 2,675 (3.55%)
Approx. 2,500 persons in Szentendre District did not declare their ethnic group at the 2011 census.

Religion
Religious adherence in the county according to 2011 census:

Catholic – 29,034 (Roman Catholic – 28,351; Greek Catholic – 665);
Reformed – 9,305;
Evangelical – 959;
Orthodox – 354;
Judaism – 128;
other religions – 1,744; 
Non-religious – 12,811; 
Atheism – 1,607;
Undeclared – 21,860.

Gallery

See also
List of cities and towns in Hungary

References

External links
 Postal codes of the Szentendre District

Districts in Pest County